Soul Story is an album by organist Charles Earland which was recorded in 1971 and released on the Prestige label.

Reception

Allmusic awarded the album 3 stars.

Track listing 
All compositions by Charles Earland except where noted
 "Betty's Dilemma" - 8:12 
 "Love Story" (Francis Lai) - 10:10  
 "One for Scotty" - 6:55
 "My Scorpio Lady" - 2:20  
 "I Was Made to Love Her" (Stevie Wonder, Lula Mae Hardaway, Henry Cosby, Sylvia Moy) - 2:50  
 "Happy Medium" - 4:10

Personnel 
Charles Earland - organ, vocals
Gary Chandler (tracks 1 & 2), Virgil Jones (tracks 3-6) - trumpet
Clifford Adams Jr. - trombone (tracks 3-6)
Jimmy Vass - flute, soprano saxophone, alto saxophone (tracks 1 & 2)
Arthur Grant - tenor saxophone, flute (tracks 3-6)
Houston Person - tenor saxophone (tracks 1 & 2)
Maynard Parker - guitar
Jesse Kilpatrick Jr. (tracks 1 & 2), Billy "Kentucky" Wilson (tracks 3-6)  - drums 
Buddy Caldwell - congas, tambourine (tracks 1 & 2)
Arthur Jenkins - congas (tracks 3-6)

References 

Charles Earland albums
1971 albums
Prestige Records albums
Albums recorded at Van Gelder Studio